Frederick Maroin Curtis (October 30, 1880 – April 5, 1939) was a  Major League Baseball first baseman. Curtis played for the New York Highlanders in the  season. In two career games, he had two hits, in 9 at-bats, a .222 batting average. He batted and threw right-handed.

Curtis was born in Beaver Lake, Michigan and died in Minneapolis, Minnesota.

External links

1880 births
1939 deaths
New York Yankees players
Major League Baseball first basemen
Baseball players from Michigan
Minor league baseball managers
Cedar Rapids Rabbits players
Ottumwa Champs players
Oshkosh Indians players
Winona Pirates players
Superior Red Sox players
Winnipeg Maroons (baseball) players
Sault Ste. Marie Soos players